Oxford West and Abingdon is a constituency represented in the House of Commons of the UK Parliament since 2017 by Layla Moran, a Liberal Democrat.

History

Creation
The seat was created in 1983 as part of the reconfiguration of those in the county to avoid malapportionment, abolishing Oxford as a seat. It merged about half the city with the eastern portion of the former Abingdon seat.

MPs
Conservative John Patten (MP for Oxford in the 1979–1983 Parliament), held the seat from its creation until he retired in 1997. The seat was gained by Liberal Democrat, Evan Harris, who held the seat for thirteen years until the 2010 general election, when the Conservative Nicola Blackwood retook the seat in one of the most marginal results of that election. Blackwood held the seat until the 2017 general election, when she was defeated by Liberal Democrat Layla Moran in another marginal result.

Contests
The seat has been contested nine times, each of them general elections. At each contest the Labour party candidate has polled third—the peak share of votes to date being 20.2%, in 1997. The strongest victory, in share of the vote, was that of Harris of the Liberal Democrats in 2001, a 17.8% majority (in a seven-way contest).

The Green Party and its predecessor, the Ecology Party, stood in the first eight contests, in each losing the deposit paid.

Constituency profile
The constituency includes the town of Abingdon, the village of Kidlington, and the western and northern parts of the city of Oxford, and some of the colleges of the University of Oxford. At the end of 2010, unemployment was the fifth lowest of the 84 South East constituencies, at 1.2% compared to a mean of 2.45%.

Boundaries and boundary changes

1983–1997
 The District of Vale of White Horse wards of Abbey, Caldecott, Cumnor, Fitzharris, Hinksey, Kennington, Northcourt, Ock, Radley, St Helen Without, and Sunningwell and Wootton, and the City of Oxford wards of Central, Cherwell, North, South, West, and Wolvercote.
The majority of the new constituency, comprising the town of Abingdon-on-Thames and areas to the west of Oxford, was previously part of the abolished County Constituency of Abingdon in Berkshire.  The City of Oxford wards had previously been in the abolished Borough Constituency of Oxford.

1997–2010

 The District of Vale of White Horse wards of Abbey, Caldecott, Cumnor, Fitzharris, Hinksey, Kennington, Northcourt, Ock, Radley, St Helen Without, and Sunningwell and Wootton, the City of Oxford wards of Central, Cherwell, North, West, and Wolvercote, and the District of Cherwell wards of Gosford, North West Kidlington, and South East Kidlington.
Kidlington transferred from Witney.  The South ward of the City of Oxford transferred to Oxford East.

Since 2010

 The District of Vale of White Horse wards of Abingdon Abbey and Barton, Abingdon Caldecott, Abingdon Dunmore, Abingdon Fitzharris, Abingdon Northcourt, Abingdon Ock Meadow, Abingdon Peachcroft, Appleton and Cumnor, Kennington and South Hinksey, North Hinksey and Wytham, Radley, and Sunningwell and Wootton, the City of Oxford wards of Jericho and Osney, North, St Margaret's, Summertown, and Wolvercote, and the District of Cherwell wards of Kidlington North, Kidlington South, and Yarnton, Gosford and Water Eaton.
Further loss to Oxford East, including the city centre, following revision of City of Oxford wards.  Marginal realignment of boundary with Wantage. Yarnton transferred from Witney.

Members of Parliament

Elections

Elections in the 2010s

Elections in the 2000s

Elections in the 1990s

Elections in the 1980s

Neighbouring constituencies

See also
 List of parliamentary constituencies in Oxfordshire
 Opinion polling for the next United Kingdom general election in individual constituencies
 Banbury
 Henley
 Oxford East
 Wantage
 Witney

Notes

References

Sources

 Election result 2015
Election result, 2015 (BBC)
Election result, 2010 (BBC)
Election result, 2005 (BBC)
Election results, 1997–2001 (BBC)
Election results, 1997–2001 (Election Demon)
Election results, 1983–1997 (Election Demon)

 

Abingdon-on-Thames
Oxford West and Abingdon
Parliamentary constituencies in Oxfordshire
Politics of Oxford
Constituencies of the Parliament of the United Kingdom established in 1983